The 7th Gaudí Awards, organised by the Catalan Film Academy, were presented at the Sant Jordi Club in Barcelona on 1 February 2015. The gala was hosted by Àngel Llàcer.

Winners and nominees 
The winners and nominees are listed as follows:

Honorary Award 
Director Ventura Pons was the recipient of the Gaudí honorary award.

References 

Gaudí Awards
2015 in Catalonia
2015 film awards
21st century in Barcelona
February 2015 events in Spain